Colle Soglio is a frazione of the comune of Cerreto di Spoleto in the Province of Perugia, Umbria, central Italy. It stands at an elevation of 663 metres above sea level. At the time of the Istat census of 2001 it had 23 inhabitants.

References 

Frazioni of Corciano